Aguda may refer to:

People
Aguda people
 In Nigeria, liberated "returnee" Africans from Brazil were commonly known as "Agudas"; see Liberated Africans in Nigeria
 Emperor Taizu of Jin, born Wányán Āgǔdǎ (1068–1123), the founder and first emperor of the Jurchen-led Jin dynasty of China
Wanyan Aguda (manga artist)

 Akinola Aguda (1923–2001), Nigerian jurist and former Chief Justice of Botswana
Pemi Aguda, Nigerian writer, architect, and podcast host
Godwin Aguda (born  1997, Nigerian professional footballer

Other
 Aguda Point, on the west coast of Graham Land, on the Antarctic Peninsula
 A parish in the municipality of Figueiró dos Vinhos, Portugal
 Aguda or agudah (אגודה) (possessive: agudas or agudath (אגודת)) are Hebrew terms for "union" or "organisation". Organizations known commonly as "Aguda" include:
 Agudath Israel of America
 World Agudath Israel
 Agudas Chasidei Chabad
 Agudat Israel
 The Aguda – Israel's LGBT Task Force, Israel's national LGBT organization